Three of Wands or Three of Batons is a playing card of the suit of wands. In Tarot, it is a Minor Arcana card.

Tarot cards are used throughout much of Europe to play Tarot card games.

In English-speaking countries, where the games are largely unknown, Tarot cards came to be utilized primarily for divinatory purposes.

Divination usage

A calm onlooker facing towards the sea. There's a possibility that he is a merchant or looking forward to a journey. The three represents creation - looking forward to something with optimism - a mission. This card symbolizes enterprise, trade, or commerce. 

Keynotes: Achievement - venture - traveling - pursuing a journey

If the card is in reversed, it means the end of a task, toil, a cessation, and disappointment.

Key meanings
The key meanings of the Three of Wands:
Achievement
Fresh starts
Long-term success
Partnerships
Trade

In popular culture

In The Waste Land, T. S. Eliot associates The Man with Three Staves with the Fisher King, "quite arbitrarily".

References

Suit of Wands

zh:權杖2